Kerala Council of Churches or KCC is a regional ecumenical organisation of the Protestant and Oriental Orthodox Churches in Kerala, India. KCC is an affiliate of the National Council of Churches in India. Its constitution states "The Kerala Council of Churches is autonomous and inter-confessional, comprising Churches in Kerala and Christian Organization". The jurisdiction of the council is also limited by the constitution to the state of Kerala.

Kerala council of Churches has 15 member churches or dioceses from Kerala along with more than 21 member organizations working within Kerala. The four dioceses of the Church of South India (CSI)  within Kerala are separate members in the council as well as the Malankara Jacobite Syrian Orthodox Church and its Knanaya Archdiocese having separate memberships as well.

Structure

Triennial General Assembly 
The general assembly of the council is held every three years with delegates from each of the member churches and associated organisations where matters relating to the election of the presidium, membership, organizations are deliberated and decided along with a common theme which is studied and explored.

The last Triennial was held at the Marthoma Youth Centre, Adoor from 25 to 27 August 2016. The theme for this assembly was "Nationalism and Pluralism".

Executive Committee and the Presidium 
It is in the General assembly that the presidium and the Executive Committee of the Kerala Council of Churches is elected from the delegates sent by each of the member church and organizations. Each church can nominate one or two of their delegates as the executive committee members depending on their demographic size.

The Executive Committee meets in between the three years to decide upon matters that arise.

Member Churches 

 Believers Eastern Church
 Chaldean Syrian Church
 Church of God in South India
 CSI East Kerala Diocese
 CSI Madhya Kerala Diocese
 CSI North Kerala Diocese
 CSI South Kerala Diocese
St.Thomas Evangelical Church of India
 Jacobite Syrian Christian Church
 Malabar Independent Syrian Church
 Malankara Orthodox Syrian Church
 Malankara Syrian Knanaya Archdiocese
 Mar Thoma Syrian Church
 The India Evangelical Lutheran Church
Bible Faith Mission Church The Salvation Army Church

Emblem 

The Emblem of the Council consists of a circular image with a coconut tree, sea and a boat with the motto "You shall be my Witness" engraved around.

Desks 
There are five desks handling five areas that are deemed important by the KCC. Each desk is headed by a faculty elected by the Executive committee of KCC.

Youth and Communication Desk /EYF
Women and Ecology Desk /EWF
Dalit, Tribal and Social Concerns Desk
Faith & Unity, Dialogue, and Pastoral & Evangelistic Desk
Education and Current Affairs Desk

Commissions and Regional Zones 
The Council has constituted various commissions to give particular attention to issues that need extra attention. The commissions are headed by chairpersons elected from the delegates at the General assembly. Commissions on Youth, Social Concern, Dialogue, Women, Environment, Current Affairs, and Education currently function.

The Council also has various regional zones in the different parts of the Kerala state. They include Thiruvalla, Trivandrum, Ernakulam, Ranni, Kollam, Aluva, Kumbanad, Malappuram, Kottayam, Kottarakkara etc.

References

Christian ecumenical organizations
Christianity in Kerala
Malankara Orthodox Syrian Church
Oriental Orthodoxy in India
Protestantism in India